The 2001 Penn State Nittany Lions football team represented the Pennsylvania State University in the 2001 NCAA Division I-A football season. The team's head coach was Joe Paterno. It played its home games at Beaver Stadium in University Park, Pennsylvania.

Schedule
Penn State did not play Big Ten teams Minnesota and Purdue this year. Also, due to the events of 9/11, the Virginia game was rescheduled from September 13, 2001, to December 1, 2001.

Roster

Post season

NFL draft

Two Nittany Lions were drafted in the 2002 NFL Draft.

References

Penn State
Penn State Nittany Lions football seasons
Penn State Nittany Lions football